I Want to Grow Up  is the third studio album by American indie pop musician Colleen Green, released on February 24, 2015 through Hardly Art. The album's title is a play on the Descendents' I Don't Want to Grow Up.

Background
I Want to Grow Up was Green's first album professionally recorded in a studio. The album features Jake Orrall of JEFF The Brotherhood on guitar and Diarrhea Planet's Casey Weissbuch on drums. Green spoke on recording the album in an interview with Stereogum:

Critical reception

I Want to Grow Up received positive reviews. Pitchfork's Jes Skolnik praised Green's "elegantly wry, acerbic, hooky pop style. Her blasé delivery might seem impenetrable at first, but there is warmth and wit to her work that rewards those who are patient enough to hear its message." Tim Sendra of Allmusic dubbed it a "nice progression from her debut," complimenting its "really good pop songs that'll have you singing along after the first spin." Spin Dan Weiss wrote that "I Want to Grow Up involves aspirations rather than answers, and thus little is resolved of the album’s many inner conflicts. Only the sweet-and-sour music they’re set to offers any kind of relief." Nick Freed, writing for Consequence of Sound, described the album as an "exploration of a day in the life of a 30-year-old with an infectious punk rock soundtrack." Rob Sheffield at Rolling Stone compared the album's sound to Juliana Hatfield and the Muffs. Noel Gardner of NME wrote that "While I Want To Grow Up doesn’t exactly break new ground, it compensates by being affecting, relatable and having occasional gnarly solos."

Ben Ratliff at The New York Times wrote that "Around her songs, there is a basic air of competence, toughness, self-reliance — she's organized her sound, has identified her neuroses and doesn't need your help."

Accolades

Track listing
All songs written by Colleen Green.

Personnel
Information adapted from the album's liner notes.

Musicians
Colleen Green – guitar, vocals, production, recording, mixing engineer on "Deeper Than Love", art concept
Jake Orrall – bass guitar, synthesizer, harmonium, guitar, production
Casey Weissbuch – percussion

Production
Vance Powell – recorded by, mixing engineer
Eddie Spear – recording and mixing assistant
KRAMER – mastering engineer
Sarah Moody – layout and design
Eric Penna – cover photo

Chart performance 
I Want to Grow Up charted on the U.S. Top Heatseekers Albums chart for the week of March 14, 2015, at position 22.

Weekly charts

References

External links
 

2015 albums
Hardly Art albums